Vic Thrill (stage name for Billy Campion) is the former lead singer for the Bogmen and his supporting band.

Solo discography

 Blown From the Action (2002, Circus Clone Records)
 CE-5 (2003, Circus Clone Records)
 Circus of Enlightenment (2006, Circus Clone Records)
 Hollywood Hula Bard - Vol.1 (2017, Circus Clone Records)
 Hollywood Hula Bard - Vol.2 (2019, Circus Clone Records)
 Hollywood Hula Bard Vol.3 (2019, Circus Clone Records)

References

External links
Official site
Vic Thrill on Myspace
"Curly Oxide and Vic Thrill" on IMDB.com

American rock music groups